The following is a list of the most expensive video games ever developed, with a minimum total cost of US$50 million and sorted by the total cost adjusted for inflation. Most game budgets are not disclosed, so this list is not indicative of industry trends.

Lists

Official figures

Cancelled games

Unofficial figures

Analyst estimations

Press estimations
The following budgets have been estimated by press outlets without naming any specific analyst or firm.

See also
Lists of video games

Notes

References

Video games
Video game development
Lists of video games